Competitor for  Canada

Clifford Thomas Crowley (June 13, 1906 – April 27, 1948) was a Canadian ice hockey player who competed in the 1932 Winter Olympics.

He was born in and died in Winnipeg, Manitoba.

In 1932 he was a member of the Winnipeg Hockey Club, the Canadian team which won the gold medal. He played one match.

External links
profile

1906 births
1948 deaths
Canadian ice hockey players
Ice hockey players at the 1932 Winter Olympics
Olympic gold medalists for Canada
Olympic ice hockey players of Canada
Ice hockey people from Winnipeg
Winnipeg Hockey Club players
Olympic medalists in ice hockey
Medalists at the 1932 Winter Olympics